Grace Kelly (1929–1982) was an American actress who became Princess of Monaco.

Grace Kelly or Grace of Monaco may also refer to:
Grace V. Kelly (1877–1950), American artist
Grace Kelly (footballer) (born 1994), Australian rules football player
Grace Kelly (musician) (born 1992), American jazz musician
"Grace Kelly" (song), a 2007 song by Mika
Grace Kelly (film), a 1983 American television film
Grace of Monaco (film), a 2014 biographical drama film
Little Goose Creek (Kentucky), location of Grace, post office namesake of Grace Kelly (1880–1956)

Kelly, Grace